Grayson County is a county located in the U.S. state of Kentucky. As of the 2020 census, the population was 26,420. Its county seat is Leitchfield. The county was formed in 1810 and named for William Grayson (1740-1790), a Revolutionary War colonel and a prominent Virginia political figure. Grayson County was formerly a prohibition or dry county, but Leitchfield allowed limited alcohol sales in restaurants in 2010 and voted "wet" in 2016.

History
Grayson County was established in 1810 from land taken from Hardin and Ohio counties. The county is named for William Grayson (1740-1790), a Revolutionary War colonel and U.S. Senator from Virginia.

Three courthouses have been destroyed through fire; in 1864 by Confederate troops, and again in 1896 and 1936.

Geography

Grayson County is part of the Western Coal Field region of Kentucky. Only the western third of the county has coal; the rest lies in the Clifty Area, which has similar sandstone bedrock, some of it bituminous but never commercially exploited as tar sands or rock asphalt. The county lies in the Rough Creek Fault System, considered a potential hydrocarbon resource.

Grayson County is home to two U.S. Army Corps of Engineers lakes, Rough River Lake on the northern border of the county and Nolin River Lake on the southeast border. The lakes attract many tourists and have led to the use of "Twin Lakes" to identify some businesses and institutions, such as the Owensboro Health Twin Lakes Medical Center in Leitchfield.

Adjacent counties
 Breckinridge County  (north)
 Hardin County  (northeast/EST Border)
 Hart County  (southeast)
 Edmonson County  (south)
 Butler County  (southwest)
 Ohio County  (west)

Demographics

As of the census of 2000, there were 24,053 people, 9,596 households, and 6,966 families residing in the county. The racial makeup of the county was 98.26% White, 0.50% Black or African American, 0.17% Native American, 0.14% Asian, 0.01% Pacific Islander, 0.22% from other races, and 0.71% from two or more races.  0.77% of the population were Hispanic or Latino of any race.

There were 9,596 households, out of which 32.10% had children under the age of 18 living with them, 58.90% were married couples living together, 10.00% had a female householder with no husband present, and 27.40% were non-families. 24.10% of all households were made up of individuals, and 10.70% had someone living alone who was 65 years of age or older.  The average household size was 2.47 and the average family size was 2.91.

In the county, the population was spread out, with 24.40% under the age of 18, 9.00% from 18 to 24, 28.00% from 25 to 44, 24.60% from 45 to 64, and 14.00% who were 65 years of age or older.  The median age was 38 years. For every 100 females there were 98.10 males.  For every 100 females age 18 and over, there were 95.80 males.

The median income for a household in the county was $27,639, and the median income for a family was $33,080. Males had a median income of $27,759 versus $19,302 for females. The per capita income for the county was $14,759.  About 13.90% of families and 18.10% of the population were below the poverty line, including 24.10% of those under age 18 and 15.70% of those age 65 or over.

Politics

Events and attractions
Grayson County is the home of the Historic Jack Thomas House which is owned and maintained by the Grayson County Historical Society.  The Jack Thomas House contains a museum dedicated to the history and families of Grayson County as well as the most extensive genealogical research library for the county.  It is open Monday – Friday for tours and research.  Three general meetings with guest speakers relevant to the county each year are held for the membership.  They are held in March, June, and October and are always open to the public.  The house is open during the Twin Lakes National Fiddlers Contest (see below), the Hometown Christmas Parade as well as other special events.

Every July, Grayson County and Leitchfield host the Twin Lakes National Fiddlers Contest, which brings many elite fiddlers from several states to the Town Square area. The contest is a weekend event. Also in July, the City of Leitchfield hosts the annual Freedom Festival which features music, fireworks, and a carnival. In late August and early September, Grayson County hosts the annual Grayson County Fair, which entertains locals and guests with music, a carnival, a Truck and Tractor Pull, a Demolition Derby, and ends on Labor Day with a parade through Leitchfield.  In September the city of Clarkson hosts the annual Honeyfest. The Honeyfest kicks off with a parade in which the Grayson County High School Band and the Grayson County Middle School Band performs.  Many floats with the main subject of bees and honey are presented and advertise the many businesses in and surrounding Grayson County. This festival celebrates the city and the contributions of Clarkson's Walter T. Kelley Beehive Factory.

In early October, the city of Caneyville holds the annual Caneyville Fair.

Also, the county is home to several attractions.  In addition to the previously mentioned lakes is the historic Pine Knob Theatre, located in the community of Pine Knob.  Other attractions are Calvin Ray's Live Music just west of Leitchfield, and three golf courses, including 18 hole Lafayette Golf Course in Falls of Rough.

Communities

Cities
 Caneyville
 Clarkson
 Leitchfield (county seat)

Census-designated place
 Big Clifty

Other unincorporated places
Anneta
Do Stop
Falls of Rough (partly in Breckinridge County)
Grayson Springs
Meredith
Millerstown
Millwood
Moutardier
Peonia
Pine Knob
Ready
Sadler
Saint Paul
Short Creek
Shrewsbury
Snap
Tar Hill
Wax

Transportation

Railroads
Paducah & Louisville Railroad

Highways

Airport
Grayson County Airport

See also

 National Register of Historic Places listings in Grayson County, Kentucky

References

External links
 
 Cityhelp.com – A local county guide about Grayson, County Kentucky
 Grayson-County.Org – A local website that links civic organizations
 Twin Lakes National Fiddler Championship - Nationally Certified Fiddler Championship
 GraysonCountySchools.com The Grayson County Board of Education and school websites.
 K105/Twin Lakes Times – Grayson County's local FM radio station (FM 104.9) and daily web-based newspaper.
 The Record – A Grayson County newspaper.
 News-Gazette – A Grayson County newspaper.
 Grayson County Tourism – A Grayson County Tourism site.
 Leitchfield Tourism – A Leitchfield Tourism site.
 Grayson County Chamber – The Grayson County Chamber site.

 
Kentucky counties
1810 establishments in Kentucky
Populated places established in 1810